The Gate Theatre is a theatre in London, Camden.  In July 2022, it announced a new residence at 26 Crowndale, Camden, London, NW1 TT, following an extensive search for a more accessible home. The new premises offers a wheelchair accessible and step-free performance space with 120 seats, as well as an in-house bar and foyer space. It was originally established above the Prince Albert pub in Notting Hill in 1979. With 75 seats, it was known as the smallest “off-West End” theatre in the city.

History 

The Gate was opened in 1979 in Notting Hill, before moving to Camden in 2022.

The Gate has won numerous awards, including Olivier, Critic's Circle, Peter Brook, Fringe First, LWT, and Time Out awards. Its work has been nominated for Off West End, Stage, Evening Standard, Carol Tambor, Amnesty International, and South Bank awards.

Some of the actors and practitioners to have worked at the Gate include Sir Robert Stephens, Stephen Daldry, Jude Law, Kelly Hunter, Rachel Weisz, Alex Kingston, Kathy Burke, Sam Shepherd, Sir Peter Hall, Sarah Kane, Katie Mitchell, Nancy Meckler, Mick Gordon, Tobias Menzies, and Ian Rickson.

Artistic Directors 

 1979–1985 Lou Stein
 1985–1990 Giles Croft
 1990–1992 Stephen Daldry
 1992–1996 Lawrence Boswell
 1996–1998 David Farr
 1998–2001 Mick Gordon
 2001–2004 Erica Whyman
 2004–2007 Thea Sharrock
 2007–2012 Natalie Abrahami and Carrie Cracknell
 2012–2017 Christopher Haydon
 2017– 2021   Ellen McDougall
 2022 -    Stef O'Driscoll (Interim)

Executive Directors 

  Kate Denby
  –2015 Jonathan Hull
 2015-2016 Clare Slater
 2016-2018 Joanne Royce
 2018– 2021  Lise Bell
 2021 -   Shawab Iqbal

References

External links 
 Homepage

Pub theatres in London
Buildings and structures in Notting Hill